Australia competed at the 2013 World Games held in Cali, Colombia.

Medallists

Flying disc 

Australia won the silver medal.

Karate 

Tsuneari Yahiro won the bronze medal in the men's kumite 67 kg event and Maria Alexiadis won the bronze medal in the women's kumite 50 kg event.

Water skiing 

Michale Briant won the bronze medal in the women's tricks event.

References 

Nations at the 2013 World Games
2013 in Australian sport
2013